Slightly Married, also known as Strange Marriage, is a 1932 American pre-Code romantic comedy film directed by Richard Thorpe and starring Evalyn Knapp, Walter Byron and Marie Prevost.

Plot
Drunk upper-class Jimmy Martin saves complete stranger Mary Smith from being sent to jail by backing up her story that she was waiting for a man who was going to marry her when she was arrested at a street corner. The suspicious judge offers to unite them on the spot, but Jimmy takes him up on it. When he sobers up, he falls in love with her, despite already having a fiancée. When his mother finds out, she threatens to have his income cut off (he will not gain control of his fortune for two years). This causes a misunderstanding. Jimmy comes to believe that Mary was interested only in his money when Mary offers to let him out of the marriage, whereas she has really fallen in love with him and merely has his best interests at heart.

Cast
 Evalyn Knapp as Mary Smith  
 Walter Byron as Jimmy Martin  
 Marie Prevost as Nellie Gordon  
 Jason Robards Sr. as Jack Haines  
 Dorothy Christy as Marjorie Reynolds
 Clarissa Selwynne as Mrs. Martin 
 Phillips Smalley as Mr. Martin  
 Herbert Evans as Hodges
 Robert Ellis as Brandon
 Lloyd Ingraham as Judge  
 Mary Foy as Landlady
 Al Bridge as Tenant  
 Bobby Burns as Minister  
 Allan Cavan as Banker  
 Jack Pennick as Sailor

References

Bibliography
 Pitts, Michael R. Poverty Row Studios, 1929-1940. McFarland & Company, 2005.

External links
 

1932 films
1932 romantic comedy films
1930s English-language films
American romantic comedy films
Films directed by Richard Thorpe
American black-and-white films
Chesterfield Pictures films
1930s American films